CSU Galați may refer to:

 CSU Galați (volleyball), a women's volleyball club
 CSU Dunărea de Jos Galați, a men's football club